The 2004 Dutch TT was the sixth round of the 2004 MotoGP Championship. It took place on the weekend of 24–26 June 2004 at the TT Circuit Assen located in Assen, Netherlands.

MotoGP classification

250 cc classification

125 cc classification

Championship standings after the race (motoGP)

Below are the standings for the top five riders and constructors after round six has concluded.

Riders' Championship standings

Constructors' Championship standings

 Note: Only the top five positions are included for both sets of standings.

References

Dutch TT
Dutch
Tourist Trophy